The tree ferns are arborescent (tree-like) ferns that grow with a trunk elevating the fronds above ground level, making them trees. Many extant tree ferns are members of the order Cyatheales, to which belong the families Cyatheaceae (scaly tree ferns), Dicksoniaceae, Metaxyaceae, and Cibotiaceae. It is estimated that Cyatheales originated in the early Jurassic, and is the third group of ferns known to have given rise to tree-like forms. The others are the extinct Tempskya of uncertain position, and Osmundales where the extinct Guaireaceae and some members of Osmundaceae also grew into trees. In addition there were the Psaroniaceae and Tietea in the Marattiales, which is the sister group to most living ferns including Cyatheales.

Other ferns which are also tree ferns, are Leptopteris and Todea in the family Osmundaceae, which can achieve short trunks under a metre tall. Fern species with short trunks in the genera Blechnum, Cystodium and Sadleria from the order Polypodiales, and smaller members of Cyatheales like Calochlaena, Cnemedaria, Culcita (mountains only tree fern), Lophosoria and Thyrsopteris are also considered tree ferns.

Range
Tree ferns are found growing in tropical and subtropical areas worldwide, as well as cool to temperate rainforests in Australia, New Zealand and neighbouring regions (e.g. Lord Howe Island, etc.). Like all ferns, tree ferns reproduce by means of spores formed on the undersides of the fronds.

Description

The fronds of tree ferns are usually very large and multiple-pinnate. Their trunk is actually a vertical and modified rhizome, and woody tissue is absent. To add strength, there are deposits of lignin in the cell walls and the lower part of the stem is reinforced with thick, interlocking mats of tiny roots. If the crown of Dicksonia antarctica (the most common species in gardens) is damaged, it will inevitably die because that is where all the new growth occurs. But other clump-forming tree fern species, such as D. squarrosa and D. youngiae, can regenerate from basal offsets or from "pups" emerging along the surviving trunk length. Tree ferns often fall over in the wild, yet manage to re-root from this new prostrate position and begin new vertical growth.

Uses

Tree-ferns have been cultivated for their beauty alone; a few, however, were of some economic application, chiefly as sources of starch. The Alsophila excelsa of Norfolk Island was threatened with extinction for the sake of its sago-like pith, which was eaten by hogs. Cyathea medullaris also furnished a kind of sago to the natives of New Zealand, Queensland and the Pacific islands. A Javanese species of Dicksonia (D. chrysotricha) furnishes silky hairs, which were once imported as a styptic, and the long silky or wooly hairs, abundant on the stem and frond-leaves in the various species of Cibotium have not only been put to a similar use, but in the Hawaiian Islands furnished wool for stuffing mattresses and cushions, which was formerly an article of export.

Species

It is not certain the exact number of species of tree ferns there are, but it may be close to 600-700 species. Many species have become extinct in the last century as forest habitats have come under pressure from human intervention.

Lophosoria (tropical America, 1 species)
Metaxya (tropical America, 1 species)
Sphaeropteris (tropical America, India, Southeast Asia to New Zealand, the Marquesas, and Pitcairn Island, about 120 species)
Alsophila (pantropic area, about 230 species)
Nephelea (tropical America, about 30 species)
Trichipteris (tropical America, about 90 species)
Cyathea (tropical America, Australasia, about 110 species)
Cnemidaria (tropical America, about 40 species)
Dicksonia (tropics and southern subtropics in Island Southeast Asia, Australasia, America, Hawaii, St. Helena, about 25 species)
Cystodium (Island Southeast Asia, 1 species)
Thyrsopteris (Juan Fernández Islands, 1 species)
Culcita (tropical America, Macaronesia, Iberian Peninsula, 2 species)
Cibotium (Southeast Asia, Hawaii, Central America, about 12 species)

References

External links 
 Flora Technical Note No. 5: Identification and management of tree ferns from Tasmania Forest Practices Authority
 Tree Fern from the San Diego Zoo website

Ferns
Plant common names
Plants by habit